MV Barfleur is a ferry operated by Brittany Ferries on the route between Poole on the south coast of England and Cherbourg, France.  She was built at Masa Yards Turku New Shipyard in Finland for the Brittany Ferries subsidiary Truckline and entered service in 1992. In 1999 she was repainted in Brittany Ferries standard livery. Barfleur was the last ship to carry the 1983–2002 version of the Brittany Ferries logo and livery which was replaced by the post-2002 version in March 2009. She sails under the French flag and is registered in Cherbourg. Excluding the HSC Normandie Express and RoRo cargo vessels, she is the smallest passenger vessel in Brittany Ferries' fleet.

From 27 April 2012 until December that year, she was in service with DFDS Seaways who had renamed her as Deal Seaways to ensure she had the same initials as their other ships, all DS. She was used on their joint Dover–Calais route with LD Lines.

Withdrawal and temporary return to service, 2010–2011
On 19 December 2009 Brittany Ferries announced that they would be withdrawing Barfleur from its service between Poole and Cherbourg. They claimed to have been losing money on the service for quite some time. After completing her last trip in February 2010 Barfleur was laid up in the canal near to Caen. For many months there was much speculation as to the future of the vessel with many believing it was to be chartered to another operator.
On 16 December 2010, almost a year after the announcement of withdrawal, Brittany Ferries made a statement that Barfleur would resume service on the Poole to Cherbourg route commencing on 27 February 2011. However, the service was to be aimed at freight traffic with proportionately fewer passengers.

On 11 July 2011, Brittany Ferries further announced that Barfleur would again be withdrawn from service between Poole and Cherbourg with effect from 3 October 2011, citing ongoing profitability concerns. The company further commented that the service 'may be reintroduced for the Summer 2012 season'.

It was announced on 10 February 2012 that Barfleur would not resume service in 2012 due to the ongoing difficult economic situation. She would remain laid up at Caen for the foreseeable future.

Transfer to Dover-Calais under DFDS

The French press reported on 23 March 2012 that the ship had been acquired by LD Lines/DFDS Seaways for their joint Dover–Calais service where she would be put into service starting on 27 April. Announcements from Brittany Ferries  and DFDS confirmed that Barfleur was to be chartered by the DFDS/LD Lines joint venture. DFDS renamed her as Deal Seaways to ensure she had the same initials as their other ships, all DS.

Deal Seawayss charter was scheduled to end in February 2013 and Brittany Ferries announced that would be renaming her Barfleur, bringing her back into service. DFDS/LD Lines therefore sought a new vessel and managed to charter ex , which had been acquired by Scapino Shipping Ltd after SeaFrance's liquidation. Deal Seaways proceeded to Dunkerque for lay-up and de-storing, and was not used by DFDS Seaways before her livery was changed back to that of Brittany Ferries.

Return to Poole-Cherbourg route
The Barfleur returned to the Poole–Cherbourg route on 19 March 2013, running alongside  which inaugurated a new route between Poole and Bilbao, also starting on the same date.  The Barfleur re-commenced overnight services between Cherbourg and Poole in November 2013, on a Tuesday and a Wednesday in place of the usual evening service. These overnight sailings were also repeated in 2014 except during the peak summer period. The Barfleur was laid up for the winter period with the last sailing from Poole being on Wednesday 31 January 2018 but returned to service on 4 March 2018.

In January 2023, during an interview with La Presse De La Manche (Actu.fr), Jean-Marc Roué told the interviewers that the company plans to replace Barfleur with the Cotentin. However the date for this has not been confirmed, but is expected to be around 2026. 

Routes served

2013 onwards
 Poole–CherbourgCommencing on 19 March 2013, Barfleur has run between Poole and Cherbourg, a short sailing of approximately  hours each way. There was a winter break from 1 January to 3 March 2018.

1992–2012Poole–CherbourgDue to a massive increase in passenger numbers on the Poole–Cherbourg route in 1991, Barfleur was lengthened by 19 metres during construction. This increased passenger and freight capacity as well as adding a number of additional cabins. But sources working on this project talk about stability issues and the addition of a section of 7.2 meters or 9 meters (?).

During the winter seasons of 1997 and 1998 Barfleur operated between Poole and Santander at weekends and made the crossing in 28 hours.

Barfleur's place at Poole was taken by MV Purbeck.

On rare occasions Barfleur has also operated routes not usually undertaken by Brittany Ferries:-

Poole–CaenBarfleur has sailed on this route as a positioning move to provide refit cover but also as a result of strike action by French dockworkers in October 2002.

Poole–Roscoff
As a result of the previously mentioned strike a round trip to Roscoff was undertaken in October 2002 to facilitate a crew change.  This route was repeated between 23 and 26 May 2008 due to a blockade of Cherbourg by French fishermen.

Cherbourg–Cork
In December 2005 Barfleur'' was chartered by Victor Treacy International for a one off freight-only crossing to help clear a buildup of freight caused by a strike at Irish Ferries.

Accidents
On 16 July 2014 at 6:26am the ferry collided with a chain of the chain ferry crossing Poole harbour entrance, snapping the chain and causing the chain ferry to be out of action for 2 days. This happened on a previous occasion (believed to be around 1996) when damage to the rudder/propellers occurred. The chain ferry now remains stationary on the Studland side when large shipping is passing through.

References

External links
 

1991 ships
DFDS
Ferries of the United Kingdom
Ferries of France
Ships built in Turku